Julius de Berry may have been a minor French nobleman, and a citizen of Auvers (i.e. Antwerp) who was knighted by the Emperor and King of France, Charles Simplex, in 916 for a gift of ripe strawberries. Legend has it that Julius' strawberries were so succulent, that King Charles granted him a coat of arms, which come down to the present as the arms of the Chief of the Name and Arms of Fraser. Legend mentions his grandfather's name was Chantilly. Flora Fraser, 21st Lady Saltoun.

See also
 Amédée-François Frézier

References 

Clan Fraser